Yvonne Y. Clark (born Georgianna Yvonne Young;  April 13, 1929 – January 27, 2019) was a pioneer for African-American and women engineers. She was the first woman to get a Bachelor of Science degree in mechanical engineering at Howard University, the first woman to earn a master's degree in Engineering Management from Vanderbilt University, and the first woman to serve as a faculty member in the College of Engineering and Technology at Tennessee State University, afterward becoming a professor emeritus.

Early life and education
Yvonne was born in 1929 in Houston, Texas and raised in Louisville, Kentucky. Her father Dr. Coleman Milton Young, Jr. was a physician/surgeon and her mother Hortense Houston Young was a librarian and journalist the Louisville Defender. Her brother, C. Milton Young III, became a physician. As a child she had a love for building and fixing things, but was not allowed to take mechanical drawing class at school because she was a girl. She took an aeronautics class in high school and joined the school's Civil Air Patrol, where she learned to shoot and had flying lessons in a simulator.

In 1945 she graduated from high school at age 16 and spent the next two years studying at Girls Latin School in Boston. Clark then became the first woman to earn a degree in mechanical engineering from Howard University, where she was a cheerleader and the only female in her class of almost entirely returned World War II veterans. After she graduated in 1951 she found that "the engineering job market wasn't very receptive to women, particularly women of color".

Clark was the first African-American woman to earn a master's degree in Engineering Management from Vanderbilt University in 1972, after having sent the first African-American students to their engineering department earlier. Her thesis was titled "Designing procedures for materials flow management in major rebuild projects in the glass industry".

Career
Yvonne's first job after gaining her degree was in the Frankford Arsenal Gauge Lab, a U.S. Army ammunition plant in Philadelphia. She then moved to a small record label, RCA Camden, in New Jersey, where she designed factory equipment. Clark returned to the South to get married, and became the first female member of the Tennessee State University mechanical engineering department, joining the faculty in 1956. She twice chaired the department, initially from 1965 until 1970 and then starting in 1977 and held the position for 11 years. She retired as a professor.

Clark helped to start Tennessee State's chapter of Pi Tau Sigma, a mechanical engineering society. She made great effort to encourage women to become engineers, and reported in 1997 that 25% of the students in her department were female.

Clark has worked for NASA, Westinghouse, and Ford.

Research
Clark spent many summers at Frankford Arsenal doing research on recoilless weapons.  She also spent a summer working with NASA in Huntsville, Alabama where she investigated Saturn V engines for hot spots. She then spent a summer at the NASA Manned Spacecraft Center in Houston, helping design the containers Neil Armstrong used to bring Moon samples back to earth.

Clark did further research that discovered methods for revitalizing and modernizing part of the inner city through the Westinghouse's Defense and Space Center in Baltimore, Maryland. As of the 1990s, her research focuses on refrigerants. She is the main investigator for the research project "Experimental Evaluation of the Performance of Alternative Refrigerants in Heat Pump Cycles" funded by the Department of Energy's Oak Ridge National Laboratory. Clark is the student division team leader for the NASA funded project at TSU called the Center for Automated Space Science.

Personal life
Yvonne married William F. Clark Jr, a biochemistry teacher at Meharry Medical College, in 1955. Her husband was originally from Raleigh, North Carolina. They had a son in 1956 and a daughter in 1968. Her daughter, Carol Lawson, interviewed Clark for the Society of Women Engineers in 2007. She died at her home in Nashville on January 27, 2019.

Awards
 Member and Executive Committee, Society of Women Engineers (1952 - )
 Fellow of the Society of Women Engineers (1984 - )
 Mechanism of the Year Award given by the TSU student Chapter of ASME for her unyielding support to her students. (1990)
 Women  of  Color  Technology  Award for Educational Leadership, by U.S. Black Engineers (1977)
 Adult Black Achievers Award by the Northwest Family YMCA for being a role model and mentor to the youth of today. (1977)
 Distinguished Engineering Educator Award (1998)
 Distinguished Service Award by the Tennessee Society of Professional Engineers (TSPE) for her outstanding leadership to her profession and contributions to the community. (2001)
 President's Distinguished University Award from TSU for 50 years of loyalty, dedication, and determination during her career in academia (2006)
 Educator of the Year Award by Delta Sigma Theta sorority, Nashville Alumnae chapter (2008)
 Member, American Society of Engineering Education
 Member, American Society of Mechanical Engineers

References

External links
StoryCorps Interview
interview on discrimination
interview on mentoring
interview on work/life balance
1964 profile in Ebony
1975 IEEE Transactions On Education
NKAA entry
Vanderbilt University School of Engineering
American Society of Mechanical Engineers (ASME)
Society of Women Engineers (SWE)
SWE - All Together Article
Engineering and Technology History Wiki

1929 births
2019 deaths
American mechanical engineers
African-American women engineers
American women engineers
African-American engineers
Howard University alumni
Tennessee State University faculty
Vanderbilt University alumni
Academics from Houston
People from Louisville, Kentucky
Academics from Kentucky
Kentucky women engineers
Engineers from Kentucky
21st-century women engineers
American women academics
Burials at Cave Hill Cemetery
Boston Latin Academy alumni